Maxim Pestushko (born ) is a Russia professional ice hockey player currently an unrestricted free agent, who most recently played within the Ak Bars Kazan organization in the Kontinental Hockey League (KHL). He previously played for HC Neftekhimik Nizhnekamsk, HC Dynamo Moscow, Avangard Omsk, HC Yugra and the Severstal Cherepovets in the KHL.

References

External links

1985 births
Avangard Omsk players
HC Dynamo Moscow players
HC Neftekhimik Nizhnekamsk players
Living people
Russian ice hockey forwards
Severstal Cherepovets players
HC Yugra players